John R. Nolan (born 22 May 1938) is a British film and television actor. He is known for his role as Nick Faunt in Shabby Tiger, Wayne Enterprises board member Douglas Fredericks in Batman Begins, the Gotham Tonight promotional segments for The Dark Knight, and The Dark Knight Rises.

Nolan had a recurring role in his nephew Jonathan Nolan's television series Person of Interest as John Greer, a mysterious British figure connected with Decima Technologies and the main villain from seasons three to five of the show.

Personal life
Nolan was born in London, England, and has been married to Kim Hartman since 1975. He has a son and a daughter. He is the paternal uncle of brothers Christopher and Jonathan Nolan.

Filmography

References

Other websites
 

1938 births
Living people
English male film actors
English male television actors
Male actors from London
20th-century English male actors
21st-century English male actors